
Gmina Bystra-Sidzina is a rural gmina (administrative district) in Sucha County, Lesser Poland Voivodeship, in southern Poland. Its seat is the village of Bystra; it also contains the village of Sidzina.

Neighbouring gminas
Gmina Bystra-Sidzina is bordered by the town of Jordanów and by the gminas of Jabłonka, Jordanów, Maków Podhalański, Spytkowice and Zawoja.

References
Polish official population figures 2006

Bystra-Sidzina
Gmina Bystra Sidzina